Hugh III (1142 – August 25, 1192) was Duke of Burgundy between 1162 and 1192. As duke, Burgundy was invaded by King Philip II and Hugh was forced to sue for peace. Hugh then joined the Third Crusade, distinguishing himself at Arsuf and Acre. He died at Acre in 1192.

Life
Hugh was the eldest son of Duke Odo II and Marie, daughter of Theobald II, Count of Champagne.

The rule of Hugh III marked the ending of a period of relative peace in the duchy of Burgundy. Hugh was a belligerent man and soon was involved in conflicts against King Louis VII of France over their borders. When Philip Augustus succeeded Louis in 1180, Hugh seized the opportunity and forced several men to change their allegiance to Burgundy. Philip II was not happy with the loss of his vassals and invaded the duchy, besieging Châtillon in 1186. The town fell and with it, its garrison, commanded by Odo, Hugh's heir. A peace was negotiated and Hugh had to pay a high ransom for his son and give up ambitions over French territory.

In 1187, Hugh transferred the capital of Burgundy to Dijon, and endeavoured to turn the city into a major commercial centre.

Joins crusade
Hugh then turned his energies to the Holy Land, embarking in the Third Crusade in the retinue of Philip II. Hugh played a major role in the victory of the Battle of Arsuf (September 7, 1191) and at the Siege of Acre.  When Philip returned to France in July 1191, he left Hugh in charge of the French troops. In January 1192, Hugh traveled to Ascalon and argued with Richard I of England over pay for his troops. He died August 1192 at Acre.

Marriage and issue
He was married twice:

Firstly, in 1165, to Alice (1145–1200), daughter of Matthias I, Duke of Lorraine; he repudiated her in 1183.
With his first wife, they had:
Odo III (1166–1218), his successor in the Duchy
Alexander (1170–1206), Lord of Montaigu, married Beatrix of Montaigu
Douce (1175 – c.1219), married in 1196 Simon of Semur (d. 1219), Lord of Luzy
Alice (1177 - 1266), married Béraud VII, Lord of Mercœur and Robert VI, Dauphin d'Auvergne (d. 1252)

Secondly, in 1183, to Beatrice, (1161–1228), Countess of Albon and Dauphine of Viennois, daughter of Guigues, Count of Albon and Dauphin of Viennois.
With his second wife, they had:
 Guigues VI (1184–1237), Dauphin of Viennois
 Mahaut (1190–1242), married in 1214 John I, Count of Châlon and Auxonne (1190–1267)
 Margaret (1192–1243), married in 1222 Amadeus IV (1197–1253), Count of Savoy

Ancestry

See also
 Dukes of Burgundy family tree

Notes

References

Sources

1148 births
1192 deaths
House of Burgundy
Dukes of Burgundy
Christians of the Third Crusade